Sankie Maimo (1930 – 4 September 2013) was a writer from British Southern Cameroons. Maimo moved to Ibadan, Nigeria, where he worked as a school teacher. There, he founded the journal Cameroon Voice in 1955. This was followed by a play called I Am Vindicated, and a children's book called Adventuring with Jaja. His works advocated the adoption of European values as a means to bring Africa into the wider world.

Tribute
 Sankie Maimo was awarded the Grand prix de la mémoire of the GPLA 2014.

Bibliography

 I Am Vindicated. Ibadan: Ibadan University Press, 1959 (Kraus reprint 1970).
 Sov-Mbang the Soothsayer. Yaounde: Editions Cle, 1968.
 Twilight Echoes. Yaounde: Cowrie Publications, 1979. 
 The Mask. Yaounde: Cowrie Publications, 1980.
 Succession in Sarkov. Yaounde: SOPECAM, 1986.
 Sasse Symphony. Limbe: Nooremac Press, 1989.
 Retributive Justice or “La Shivaa.” Kumbo: Maimo, 1999.

Notes

Cameroonian newspaper publishers (people)
Cameroonian dramatists and playwrights
Nigerian dramatists and playwrights
1930 births
2013 deaths
Nigerian people of Cameroonian descent
20th-century Nigerian writers
Cameroonian male writers
20th-century Nigerian dramatists and playwrights
Nigerian schoolteachers
20th-century male writers